General Angus John Campbell,  is a senior officer in the Australian Army, serving as the Chief of the Defence Force since 6 July 2018. He was previously posted as Commander Operation Sovereign Borders from September 2013 until he was appointed Chief of Army in May 2015.

Military career
Campbell attended St Gregory's College, Campbelltown before entering the Royal Military College, Duntroon in 1981, receiving a commission as an infantry lieutenant in 1984. Initially assigned to the 3rd Battalion, Royal Australian Regiment as a platoon commander, he later passed selection for the Special Air Service Regiment, with which he served as troop and squadron commander. Campbell commanded the 2nd Battalion, Royal Australian Regiment in East Timor as part of the United Nations Transitional Administration in East Timor (UNTAET), for which was appointed a Member of the Order of Australia (AM) in 2003.

Campbell served as Chief of Staff to General Peter Cosgrove and later Air Chief Marshal Angus Houston during their respective tenures as Chief of the Defence Force. In 2005, he left the full-time army and assumed a senior civilian appointment as First Assistant Secretary in the Office of National Security within the Department of the Prime Minister and Cabinet. Campbell was later promoted to Deputy Secretary, and served as Deputy National Security Adviser for a period before returning to the army in 2010.

Campbell was promoted to the rank of major general and appointed as Commander Joint Task Force 633 in 2011, responsible for all Australian forces deployed in the Middle East, including Afghanistan. For his command in Afghanistan he was awarded the Distinguished Service Cross. He was appointed the Deputy Chief of Army in February 2012.

Campbell was promoted to lieutenant general on 19 September 2013 and appointed to oversee Operation Sovereign Borders, part of the Abbott Government's immigration policy aimed at stopping maritime arrivals of asylum seekers to Australia.

In March 2015, Prime Minister Tony Abbott announced Campbell would be appointed Chief of Army from May of that year, taking over from the retiring Lieutenant General David Morrison.

On 16 April 2018, Prime Minister Malcolm Turnbull announced that Campbell would be promoted to general and succeed Air Chief Marshal Mark Binskin as Chief of the Defence Force. The change of command occurred on 6 July. In the meantime, one of Campbell's last acts as the Chief of Army was to order the removal of "death imagery" from patches and badges.

On 19 November 2020 the Brereton Report was publicly released following a four-year investigation into alleged Australian war crimes by Australian Special Forces whom were taking part in the War in Afghanistan between 2006 and 2016. On that same day Campbell announced at a press conference that the 2 Squadron, Special Air Service Regiment had immediately been disbanded and struck from the army order of battle. He also apologised for "any wrong doing by Australian soldiers" and said a "distorted culture" existed in the Australian Defence Force.

In June 2022, Campbell's tenure as Chief of the Defence Force was extended for a further two years.

In late November 2022, Campbell gave officers of Captain to Brigadier rank "28 days to prove their service in the Afghanistan war was distinguished" Up to 3,000 Australian Defence Force members are potentially facing having their medals revoked At the time of the most serious allegations in 2012, Campbell was serving as the Commander Joint Task Force 633, for which he was awarded the Distinguished Service Cross This has led to calls for Campbell to be stripped of his decoration due to findings of the Brereton Report and due to a perceived error in the original citation. "In the citation on his Distinguished Service Cross, he said he was given that award for 'distinguished command and leadership in action' - the key phrase is 'in action' and what that means is he was serving in action against the enemy in combat in Afghanistan."

Childhood and personal life 
Campbell lived in Papua New Guinea as a child.

Campbell is married to Stephanie Copus-Campbell, a former AusAID official and current chief executive officer of the Oil Search Foundation. They have two adult children.

Honours and awards

26 January 2003 – Member of the Order of Australia (AM) – "For exceptional service to the Australian Defence Force as the Commanding Officer of the 2nd Battalion Group during operational service in East Timor"
11 June 2012 – Distinguished Service Cross (DSC) – "For distinguished command and leadership in action as Commander Joint Task Force 633 on Operation SLIPPER from January 2011 to December 2011" 
12 June 2017 – Officer of the Order of Australia (AO) – "For distinguished service as Head Military Strategic Commitments, Deputy Chief of Army, and Chief of Army"
13 June 2017 – Commander of the Legion of Merit (United States) – "For exceptionally meritorious conduct in the performance of outstanding services from February 2012 to June 2017"
14 September 2017 – Meritorious Service Medal (Military) (Singapore) – "For significant contributions towards strengthening defence ties between the Australian Army and The Singapore Army"
29 April 2022 – Distinguished Service Order (Military) (Singapore) – "For significant contributions towards strengthening defence ties between the Australian Army and The Singapore Army"
 20 August 2022 – Medal of Merit (East Timor)

References

|-

|-

|-

Alumni of the University of Cambridge
Australian generals
Australian military personnel of the War in Afghanistan (2001–2021)
Australian public servants
Chiefs of Army (Australia)
Chiefs of the Defence Force (Australia)
Deputy Chiefs of Army (Australia)
Living people
Officers of the Order of Australia
Recipients of the Distinguished Service Cross (Australia)
Royal Military College, Duntroon graduates
University of New South Wales alumni
Foreign recipients of the Legion of Merit
Year of birth missing (living people)